Diego Maradona was an Argentine professional footballer who represented the Argentina national football team as an attacking midfielder and playmaker from 1977 to 1994. He had scored 34 goals in 91 appearances, making him Argentina's 5th-highest goalscorer. He earned his first cap when he was 16 years old in 1977, in a friendly 5–1 win against Hungary. He wouldn't score his first goal though, until 1979 in a friendly against Scotland. He has also represented La Albiceleste at 4 FIFA World Cups (1982, 1986, 1990, 1994) and 3 Copa Américas (1979, 1987, 1989). Most famously in his international career, he captained Argentina to victory in the 1986 World Cup Final, scoring 2 famous goals in their quarter-final match against England en route to the final better known as The Hand of God and The Goal of the Century. He also won the Golden Ball award of that tournament for being the best player. He would score his last international goal in their first 1994 World Cup match which was against Greece, where he infamously celebrated by having a scary look on his face as he screamed at a camera on the sidelines. He would ultimately, earn his last cap in their second match of the group stage against Nigeria, and never play for them again after failing a drug test.

International goals
List of international goals scored by Diego Maradona

Scores and results list Argentina's goal tally first, score column indicates score after each Maradona goal.

Statistics

References

Maradona, Diego
Maradona, Diego
Diego Maradona